This article lists events from the year 2020 in Syria.

Incumbents
 President: Bashar al-Assad
 Prime Minister: Imad Khamis (until 11 June), Hussein Arnous (starting 11 June)
 President of Supreme Constitutional Court of Syria: Adnan Zureiq

Events

For events related to the Civil War, see History of the Syrian Civil War (2020–present)

Deaths 

March 20 – Ali Habib Mahmud, former Defense Minister (b. 1939).
March 31 – Abdul Halim Khaddam, former Vice President (b. 1932).
May 13 – Riad Ismat, former Minister of Culture (b. 1947).
May 21 – Mamoon al-Farkh, actor and theater director (b. 1958).
September 3 – Ahmed Al-Qadri, Agriculture and Agrarian Minister (b. 1956).
September 12 – Mohammed Makhlouf, Syrian businessman and the uncle of President Bashar al-Assad.
November 16 – Walid Muallem, Deputy Prime Minister (b. 1941).

See also

 Syria
 History of Syria
 Outline of Syria
 Politics of Syria
 Government of Syria

Specific issues and events
 Syrian Civil War
 Timeline of the Syrian Civil War
 COVID-19 pandemic in Syria

References

 
2020s in Syria
Years of the 21st century in Syria
Syria
Syria